The Aysén del General Carlos Ibáñez del Campo Region, often shortened to Aysén Region or Aisén, is one of Chile's 16 first order administrative divisions. Although the third largest in area, the region is Chile's most sparsely populated region with a population of 102,317 as of 2017. The capital of the region is Coihaique, the region's former namesake.

The landscape is marked by several glaciations that formed many lakes, channels and fjords. The region contains icefields including the Northern Patagonian Ice Field and the Southern Patagonian Ice Field, the world's third largest after those in Antarctica and Greenland. The northern half of the region feature a north-south string of volcanoes. While the western part of the region is densely vegetated and mountainous, the eastern reaches contain open grasslands and much flat and rolling terrain. 

Aysén Region was the last major area to be effectively incorporated into the Republic of Chile, with the first permanent settlements emerging in the second half of the 19th century and the inland part being settled at the turn of the century. Until the construction of Route 7 (the Carretera Austral, or Southern Highway) in the 1980s, the only overland routes from north to south through the region were extremely primitive tracks.

Demography
Region XI, Aysen del General Carlos Ibanez del Campo, is the least populated of the country. According to the 2002 census there were only 91,492 inhabitants in an area of 106,990.9 km². The population density is 0.85 inhabitants per km². Between 2000 and 2005, the average annual growth rate was estimated at 1.35 per 100 inhabitants.

The largest cities according to the 2002 census are Coyhaique (population 44,850), Puerto Aysen  (16,936), Chile Chico (3042), Puerto Cisnes (2517), Cochrane (2217), Melinka (1411) and Mañihuales Villa (1401).

Climate

Aysén Region climate's is classified as a cool oceanic climate with low temperatures, abundant precipitation and strong winds. The relief found throughout the region results in different types of climate zones in the western and eastern parts. There are 4 distinct climate zones found within the region. Coastal areas to the west have a cool temperate climate. The coastal areas receive abundant precipitation throughout the year with mean annual precipitation that can reach . For example, Puerto Aysen receives  of precipitation per year while on San Pedro Island, it receives . Most of the precipitation are associated with strong winds from the northwest and the north. The winter months are usually the wettest months. Temperatures decrease with latitude although owing to maritime influence which is reinforced with strong westerly winds throughout the year, temperatures are not extremely low compared to inland areas. As a result, mean temperatures rarely fall below  in the coldest months, while the diurnal range is small, averaging . Owing to the high precipitation year-round, relative humidity is high, averaging 87% with no months averaging below 80%. High cloud cover dominates the coastal areas year round.

Precipitation is the highest from May to August, which receives 50% of the annual precipitation. During periods of cold temperatures, precipitation can fall as snow during these months. Being located inland and farther away from the maritime influence, the climate is more continental than coastal areas. With lower precipitation, relative humidity is lower, averaging between 71% to 74% in Cochrane and Coyahique respectively. Cloud cover is lower and there are more clear days in inland areas than coastal areas.

Corresponding to the Northern Patagonian Ice Field and the Southern Patagonian Ice Field, which are located at higher altitudes, temperatures are cold enough to maintain permanent ice fields. These two ice fields receive abundant precipitation year-round, particularly in the west facing slopes of the Andes that descend to the ocean and fiords. The climate is very windy. No meteorological stations exist in the ice fields so it is estimated that the average high, average low and mean temperatures are below  in all months to maintain permanent ice fields.

The easternmost parts of the region have a cold steppe climate. Precipitation is significantly lower than the other parts of the region with mean monthly precipitation below . Precipitation is concentrated from May to August where these months are responsible for 55% to 65% of the total annual precipitation. Snowfall can occur during these months owing to colder temperatures. Mean summer temperatures can exceed  in Chile Chico, which permits agriculture, similar to the one in the central parts of the country. This is due to the moderating influence of General Carrera Lake which prevents temperatures from dropping too low. The vegetation is mostly shrubs owing to the low temperatures and precipitation. Relative humidity is lower, with mean annual values varying between 62% to 71%.

Economy
The primary sector dominates in the regional economy, which focuses on the exploitation and processing of marine, mining, forestry, and animal resources. Aquaculture is also an important activity and the region contributes 80% of Chile's salmon output.

The archipelago and fjord region in the west is primarily oriented towards the exploitation and cultivation of marine resources. Since the 1980s, the extraction of sea urchins and locos have featured prominently in the economy of Guaitecas Archipelago. In 1985 the discovery of merluza fishing grounds in Moraleda Channel sparkled a fishing boom. In the 1990s, salmon aquaculture became an important economic activity and has remained so.

An industrial park, devoted mainly to producing frozen and, to a lesser extent, canned, products has developed around Puerto Chacabuco, Puerto Aisén, and Puerto Cisnes.

Although mining, based on polymetallic deposits of zinc, gold, and silver, makes a small contribution to Chile's total mining GDP, it is significant in regional exports.

Exploitation of forests and the production of yard timber, plywood, and panels for furniture is mostly geared to export markets. Animal husbandry focuses on beef cattle, sheep, and sheep's wool, part of which is exported.

Government and administration

Aysén del General Carlos Ibáñez del Campo Region is subdivided into 4 provinces in which each province is divided into municipalities (communes). There are a total of 10 municipalities in Aysén Region.

According to a 2021 study Aysén Region is one of the three Chilean regions that are most prone to suffer nepotism and elite capture.

History

Early inhabitants
The earliest historically known inhabitants of the fjords and channels of Aysén Region are  the Chono and Kawésqar. These two groups shared a life style as canoe-faring hunther-gatherers. They also shared physical traits such as being of low stature, long-headed (Dolichocephalic) and having a "low face".  Despite similarities their languages were completely different. The Chono moved around in the area from Chiloé Archipelago to 50° S and the Kawésqar from 46° S to the Strait of Magellan. Thus both groups overlapped in Gulf of Penas, Guayaneco Archipelago and other islands. Yaghans inhabited a reduced area south of Tierra del Fuego. Both Chonos and Kawésqar used Pilgerodendron uviferum as firewood as well as wood for rows, boats and houses.

Guaitecas Archipelago made up the southern limit of Pre-Hispanic agriculture as noted by the mention of the cultivation of potatoes by a Spanish expedition in 1557.

Colonial era 
Pedro de Valdivia sought originally to conquer all of southern South America to the Straits of Magellan (53° S). He did however only reach Reloncaví Sound (41°45' S). Later in 1567 Chiloé Archipelago (42°30' S) was conquered, from there on southern expansion of the Spanish Empire halted. The Spanish are thought to have lacked incentives for further conquests south. The indigenous populations were scarce and had ways of life that differed from the sedentary agricultural life the Spanish were accostumed to. The harsh climate in the fjords and channels of Patagonia may also have deterred further expansion. Indeed, even in Chiloé did the Spanish encounter difficulties to adapt as their attempts to base the economy on gold extraction and a "hispanic-mediterranean" agricultural model failed.

During colonial times, the fjords and channels of Patagonia were first explored by the Spaniards. There were a number of motivations for their explorations, including a desire to Christianize indigenous peoples, to prevent intrusions of foreign powers into territory claimed by Spain, to increase geographic knowledge of the zone, and finally, to search for a mythical city called City of the Caesars. False rumours of European settlements near the Straits of Magellan led the Spanish to organize the Antonio de Vea expedition of 1675–1676 which was the largest expedition to the date. In 1792, the viceroy of Peru ordered the exploration of the Patagonian channels in order to find an entrance to the interior of Patagonia. The said order was carried of by José de Moraleda who led an expedition that visited many of the main channels of the zone.

Following the decline of the Chono populations in the archipelago in the 18th century, the area gained a reputation of "emptyness" among Chileans akin to the description of eastern Patagonia as a "desert."  However, the islands were often visited and traversed in the 19th century by fishermen, lumberjacks, and hunters from Chiloé. This makes it clear that many areas that were traversed by explorers were already known to the inhabitants of southern Chiloé who visited these areas for wood, fish or hunting.

Over-all the physical infrastructure of the Spanish in the fjords and channels during the colonial period was negligible and consisted of a few chapels built in the 1610s and 1620s and a wooden fortress built in 1750. All these buildings were abandoned after a few years.

Becoming part of Chile
The Aysen region was the last to be integrated into the Chile state, long after even the southernmost region of Magallanes and Chilean Antarctica. Its geographical location and transport difficulties explain the lack of interest in the nineteenth century for this region, to the point that no one even thought of colonizing it with immigrants, as happened with the other southern regions.

In 1870, Aysén Fjord was explored by Enrique Simpson onboard the Chacabuco, who discovered its usefulness for accessing more inland locations. The exploitation of Pilgerodendron uviferum in the archipelagoe and fjords of Aysén Region contributed to link early economy of the region to Chiloé Archipelago further north.

Following the signing of the Boundary Treaty with Argentina in 1881, European settlers came from the Pampas to the valleys that cross the Andes from east to west. These private efforts led to the uncoordinated creation of cities of Puerto Aysen in 1904 and Balmaceda and Coyhaique in 1917 and 1929, respectively. The oldest town is Melinka, established by the mid-nineteenth century on Ascension Island in the Guaitecas Archipelago.

The indigenous population was sparse. In the insular region, the Guaitecas and Chonos inhabited the Chonos Archipelago. They are believed to have become extinct in the 20th century. In the archipelagos south of the Gulf of Penas and to Tierra del Fuego lived the Alacalufes or Kaweshkar, also fishermen. Both groups were quickly decimated by disease and attacks by settlers in the late 19th century coming from northern and southern Chile and Europe; a great number of the Europeans were from Germany, Switzerland, Austria, the former Yugoslavia, Italy, Spain, the Netherlands, Denmark, Norway and the United Kingdom. Large numbers of Russians, Croats, Scots, Welsh, Irish, and Sudeten Germans from present Czech Republic arrived by government invitation and land sale programs to assist in populating southern Chile and to reduce the number of indigenous peoples.

Culture
 
The Aysén region of Chile, represents a cultural exchange mainly between Argentina and the Chiloé Archipelago which form the main settler groups that inhabit the area. The Gaucho is an important symbol of the region shaping the cuisine, dance, and music of Aysén rather than the Huaso of Central Chile. The main difference between the Guacho and Huaso is the former is involved in cattle and sheep herding, while the latter tends to be more oriented around farming. The settler heritage of the region arising from Argentina and Chiloé have also led to a unique dialect of Spanish distinct from Central Chile, especially in the areas along the border with Argentina. It is the blend of these cultures and geographic isolation that make Aysén a region distinct from the national identity of Chile which to a large degree developed around the center of the country.

Cuisine

See also
Aisén (disambiguation)

References

Bibliography

External links

—Goreaysen.cl: Official Aysén Region website

 
Patagonia
Regions of Chile